Lu Donghua (卢东华; born 19 January 1982) is a Chinese former backstroke swimmer who competed in the 2000 Summer Olympics.

References

1982 births
Living people
Chinese female backstroke swimmers
Olympic swimmers of China
Swimmers at the 2000 Summer Olympics
Medalists at the FINA World Swimming Championships (25 m)
21st-century Chinese women